The  2009 RoadRunner Turbo Indy 300 was the third round of the 2009 IndyCar Series season, held on April 26, 2009 at the  Kansas Speedway. The race was won by Scott Dixon, who led 134 of the 200 laps to move up into fourth place in the championship standings. Championship leader Dario Franchitti made contact with the wall, and was classified eighteenth, which dropped him to third overall. Tony Kanaan's third place was enough to give him the championship lead, by a point from Ryan Briscoe, who finished fourth.

Race

Standings after the race 
Drivers' Championship standings

 Note: Only the top five positions are included for the standings.

RoadRunner Turbo Indy 300
Kansas Indy 300
RoadRunner Turbo
RoadRunner Turbo Indy 300